Joseph F. Shaw (born 1882) was an English professional footballer who played as a forward.

References

1882 births
Year of death missing
Sportspeople from Durham, England
Footballers from County Durham
English footballers
Association football forwards
St Mark's F.C. players
Sunderland West End F.C. players
Armstrong College F.C. players
Durham University F.C. players
Bishop Auckland F.C. players
Darlington F.C. players
Sunderland A.F.C. players
Hull City A.F.C. players
Grimsby Town F.C. players
English Football League players